The Piperaceae, also known as the pepper family, are a large family of flowering plants. The group contains roughly 3,600 currently accepted species in 5 genera. The vast majority of species can be found within the two main genera: Piper (2,171 species) and Peperomia (over 1,000 species).

Members of the Piperaceae may be small trees, shrubs, or herbs. The distribution of this group is best described as pantropical.

The best-known species, Piper nigrum, yields most peppercorns that are used as spices, including black pepper, although its relatives in the family include many other spices.

Etymology
The name Piperaceae is likely to be derived from the Sanskrit term pippali, which was used to describe long peppers (like those of Piper longum).

Taxonomy
The APG III system of 2009 recognizes this family, and assigns it to the order Piperales in the unranked clade magnoliids. The family consists of five genera: Piper, Peperomia, Zippelia, Manekia, and Verhuellia. The previously recognised Pacific genus Macropiper, was recently merged into Piper. A tentative cladogram showing relationships based on Wanke et al. (2007) is shown below. This phylogeny was based on 6,000 base pairs of chloroplast DNA. Only recently has it become clear that Verhuellia is sister to the other four genera in the family.

Characteristics
Members of pepper family are small trees, shrubs, or perennial or annual herbs.

Roots and stems
Plants are often rhizomatous, and can be terrestrial or epiphytic. The stems can be either simple or branched.

Leaves
Leaves are simple with entire margins, and are positioned at the base of the plant or along the stem, and can be alternate, opposite, or whorled in arrangement. Stipules are usually present, as are petioles.  The leaves are often noticeably aromatic when crushed.

Flowers
Inflorescences (in the form of spikes) are terminal, opposite the leaves, or located in the axils. Flowers are bisexual, with no perianth, each flower is subtended by a peltate bract.  Stamens are 2–6, and hypogynous, with 2-locular anthers. There are usually 3-4 stigmas attached to a single pistil per flower, which is 1 or 3-4 carpellate.  The ovary is 1 locular, and superior.

Fruits and seeds
Fruits are drupelike, with a single seed per fruit.  The seeds have a minute embryo, and mealy perisperm.

Traditional medicinal uses 
Numerous members of the Piperaceae family are used in the traditional medicinal systems of indigenous population for a wide variety of illnesses. Many studies have been undertaken to investigate these uses, with a large number of them focusing especially on the active ingredient Piperine and related compounds found in many members of this family, especially Black pepper, Long pepper and Betel.

References

External links
 Plants of the World Online, Piperaceae
 Angiosperm Phylogeny Website
 Piperaceae at the DELTA Online Families of Flowering Plants
 Piperaceae at the online Flora of North America
 Piperaceae at the online Flora of China
 Piperaceae at the online Flora of Zimbabwe
 Piperaceae at the NCBI Taxonomy Browser
 Piperaceae at the online Piperaceae in Thailand
 
 
 Plants of the World Online, Piperaceae

Magnoliid families
Pantropical flora